The Assembly of the Republic of North Macedonia, or the Sobranie, is the unicameral representative body of the citizens of North Macedonia; it is North Macedonia's sole legislature. According to the Constitution, the Sobranie represents the people and is vested with legislative power. It can have between 120 and 140 MPs (currently 120), elected by proportional representation from 6 electoral districts, each contributing 20 MPs, and there are also 3 reserved seats elected from the Macedonian diaspora which are awarded only if the voter turnout was sufficient. MPs are elected for a term of four years and cannot be recalled during their term. The Sobranie is presided over by a President. Its organization and functioning are regulated by the Constitution and Rules of Procedure. The Assembly's seat is in the nation's capital, Skopje.

2020 election result

The preliminary apportionment in the 2020 North Macedonian parliamentary election:

Presidents of the Assembly (1991–present)

 Parties
 (1)	
 (3)	
 (1)	

 (2)	
 (1)
 Status

Notes

See also
Anti-fascist Assembly for the National Liberation of Macedonia
 Assembly of the Socialist Republic of Macedonia

External links
 

Government of North Macedonia
Macedonia, Republic
Macedonia, Republic
Macedonia, Republic
1991 establishments in the Republic of Macedonia